Talking to India is a book authored by E. M. Forster, Ritchie Calder, Cedric Dover, Hsiao Ch'ien and others, and published by Allen and Unwin in 1943. It was edited by George Orwell following his time at the BBC Radio Eastern Service. It includes a chapter by Venu Chitale.

References

External links
 

1943 books
Books by E. M. Forster
Allen & Unwin books
Books by George Orwell